Geert Versnick (born 15 December 1956) is a Flemish liberal politician and member of Open Flemish Liberals and Democrats. He was a Member of the Belgian Chamber of Representatives from 1994 until 2010. He has a degree in laws from the Ghent University.

From 2006 to 2012 he was OCMW president and schepen (member of the municipal executive) in Ghent. Since 2012 he is deputy (member of the provincial executive) of East Flanders.

External links

1956 births
Living people
Open Vlaamse Liberalen en Democraten politicians
Members of the Belgian Federal Parliament
Ghent University alumni
21st-century Belgian politicians